Empedocles was a Greek pre-Socratic philosopher and a citizen of Agrigentum.

Empedocles may also refer to:

 6152 Empedocles, a main-belt asteroid
 Empedocles, a Hemiptera genus
 Empedocles (volcano), a large underwater volcano
 "Empedocles" (The X-Files), an episode of The X-Files